Eduard Teodorovich Vinokurov (October 30, 1942 – February 10, 2010) was a Soviet Russian Olympic champion and world champion sabre fencer.

Early and personal life
Vinokurov was born in the village of Baizhansai, South Kazakhstan Province, Kazakh SSR, and was Jewish. He attended and graduated from the Higher School of Trainers at the Leningrad Institute of Physical Culture in 1966.

Fencing career
Vinokurov began fencing in 1956. He trained at the Armed Forces sports society in Leningrad. 

He was the USSR sabre champion in 1966, and won three silver medals (1969, 1972, and 1973) and three bronze medals (1968, 1970, 1976). Vinokurov also won the Soviet Cup three times (1965, 1967, and 1972). Vinokurov won the European Cup in the team event five consecutive years, from 1967-71. 

Vinokurov was named an Honoured Master of Sports of the USSR in 1968. After his competitive career, Vinokurov worked as a fencing coach in St. Petersburg and became an international fencing referee.

World Championships
A member of the USSR National sabre team since 1966, Vinokurov won the gold medal in the team competition at the World Fencing Championships in 1967, 1969, 1970, 1971, 1974, and 1975, and also won silver medals at the World Championships in 1966 and 1973.

Olympic career
Vinokurov represented the Soviet Union in the team sabre event at the 1968, 1972, and 1976 Summer Olympics, winning 3 medals (gold medals in 1968 and 1976, and silver in 1972).

Hall of Fame
Vinokurov was inducted in 2007 into the International Jewish Sports Hall of Fame.

See also
List of select Jewish fencers

References

External links
Eduard Vinokurov's biography at Jews in Sports
Biography of Eduard Vinokurov 
Eduard Vinokurov's obituary 

1942 births
2010 deaths
Soviet male sabre fencers
Russian male sabre fencers
Kazakhstani male sabre fencers
Jewish male sabre fencers
Olympic fencers of the Soviet Union
Fencers at the 1968 Summer Olympics
Fencers at the 1972 Summer Olympics
Fencers at the 1976 Summer Olympics
Olympic gold medalists for the Soviet Union
Olympic silver medalists for the Soviet Union
Olympic medalists in fencing
Russian Jews
Jewish Kazakhstani sportspeople
International Jewish Sports Hall of Fame inductees
Medalists at the 1968 Summer Olympics
Medalists at the 1972 Summer Olympics
Medalists at the 1976 Summer Olympics
Burials at Bogoslovskoe Cemetery